Arne Oit (3 December 1928 Tallinn – 28 November 1975 Tallinn) was an Estonian composer and accordionist. He was focused on pop music songs writing.

In 1956, he graduated from Tallinn State Conservatory in composition speciality.

1955–1974, he played the accordion for Estonian Radio Instrumental Ensemble.

On the initiative of Oit, song contest "Tippmeloodia" was organized.

Since 1958, he was a member of Estonian Composers' Union.

Awards
 1972 Estonian SSR Merited Worker of Art
 1973 Estonian Music Annual Award

Works

Selected songs
 "Kevadine lugu" (1957)
 "Meie Mall" (1959)
 "Lõke preerias" (1963)
 "Jamaika hällilaul" (1961)
 "Me pole enam väikesed" (1970)

References

1928 births
1975 deaths
Estonian songwriters
20th-century Estonian composers
20th-century Estonian musicians
Estonian Academy of Music and Theatre alumni
Musicians from Tallinn
Burials at Metsakalmistu